"For Your Precious Love" is a song written by Arthur Brooks, Richard Brooks and Jerry Butler, and performed by Jerry Butler and The Impressions in 1958.  The song was ranked #335 on Rolling Stone magazine's 500 Greatest Songs of All Time in 2010.

Chart performance
It was released as a single on Vee-Jay Records and peaked at number 3 on the Most Played R&B chart, and  number 11 on the Billboard Top 100 charts.  In addition, a new version by Butler himself, who peaked at number 99 on the Hot 100 chart in March 1966.

Other versions
The song has been covered numerous times with many versions reaching the US charts as well:
Garnet Mimms (1963, Hot 100 #26)
Otis Redding covered the song for his album The Great Otis Redding Sings Soul Ballads in 1965. 
Oscar Toney, Jr. (1967, Hot 100 #23)
Jackie Wilson and Count Basie (1968, Hot 100 #49)
Linda Jones as "Your Precious Love" (1972, Hot 100 #74)
Aaron Neville covered the song for his album Orchid in the Stone in 1986.
The Rolling Stones covered it during their sessions for 1989's Steel Wheels album. It was never released, but can be heard on YouTube.
A 1968 version in South Africa by the Durban based group, The Flames, reached the top spot on the local charts and has been considered a classic in the country ever since.
Roy Meriwether covered this instrumentally, on the album “Soul Knight” (1968, Capitol Records)

Popular culture
The Otis Redding recording appears at the beginning of the 2006 French thriller Tell No One by Guillaume Canet and on the film's soundtrack album. 
The same recording can also be heard in the 2009 movie Mr. Nobody by Jaco Van Dormael.
Linda Jones version (1972) can be found among soundtracks in Ali movie of 2001 by Michael Mann.

References

1958 debut singles
The Impressions songs
Songs written by Jerry Butler
1958 songs
Vee-Jay Records singles